Futebol Clube de Vizela is a Portuguese football club based in Vizela, Braga District. Founded in 1939, it currently plays in the Liga Portugal Bwin, holding home games at the Estádio do Futebol Clube de Vizela, with a capacity for 6,100 spectators.

Brief history
Vizela joined the Braga Football Association on 1 August 1940. Twenty-six years later, the first trophy came, with the conquest of the Taça de Campeão Nacional after defeating Tramagal Sport União (5–3). The club spent the vast majority of its early years in the Campeonato de Portugal.

In 1984, Vizela promoted for the first time in its history to the Primeira Liga, but this spell only lasted one season, with the club ranking last. Shortly after, the team was again in the third level, only returning in the 2000s.

Again in the "silver category" of Portuguese football, Vizela finished third in the 2007–08 season, falling just one point short of a promotion. In the following year, it finished in 10th position, but was relegated due to the Apito Dourado scandal; for several years, the club acted as S.C. Braga's farm team.

In May 2021, the club placed 2nd in the 2020–21 Liga Portugal 2 to get promoted into the Primeira Liga for the first time in the club's history since 1985 after a 36-year absence.

Players

Current squad

Out on loan

Coaching staff

Appearances

Primeira Liga: 1
Second Level: 4
Segunda Divisão: 28
Terceira Divisão: 14
Taça de Portugal: 38
Taça da Liga (League Cup): 1

League and Cup history

Other statistics

 Primeira Liga:
Highest ranking: 16th (1984–85 season)
Lowest ranking: 16th (1984–85 season)
 Liga Portugal 2:
Highest ranking: 2nd (2020–21 season)
Lowest ranking: 13th (2006–07 season)

References

External links

Official website 
F.C. Vizela at WorldFootball
 at ZeroZero

Football clubs in Portugal
Association football clubs established in 1939
1939 establishments in Portugal
Primeira Liga clubs
Liga Portugal 2 clubs